Bartnia Góra  is a village in the administrative district of Gmina Filipów, within Suwałki County, Podlaskie Voivodeship, in north-eastern Poland.

In the Polish census of 2021, the village has a population of 19.

References

Villages in Suwałki County